The 2018 Nationals was the 48th Men's Nationals.  The Nationals was a team handball tournament to determine the National Champion from 2018 from the US.

Venues 
The championship was played at four courts at the Myrtle Beach Sports Center in Myrtle Beach, South Carolina.

Modus 

First there is a playoff game between Houston Firehawks and Los Angeles THC for the last wildcard. The winner play in the Elite Division

After that the eleven teams are split in two pools A and B and they play a round roubin.

The last teams per group played a 9-11th place semifinal.

The last third and fourth teams per group were qualified for the 5-8th place semifinals.

The losers from the 5-8th place semis played a 7th place game and the winners the 5th place game.

The best two teams per group were qualified for the semifinals.

The losers from the semis played a small final and the winners the final.

Results

4th Wildcard Playoff

Group stage

Group A

Group B

Championship

Semifinals

Small Final

Final

Consolation 5-8th Place

5-8th Place Semifinals

7th Place

5th Place

Consolation 9-11th Place

9-11th Place Semifinal

9th Place

Final ranking

Statistics

Awards

Top scorers 
Source:

All-Tournament Team

References

External links 
 Tournament Results

USA Team Handball Nationals by year
Sports in Myrtle Beach, South Carolina